Iranzamin School, also known as Iranzamin, Tehran International School (Irānzamin, Madreseh-ye Baynalmelali-e Tehrān) was a combined Iranian and American international school founded in 1967 in Tehran, Iran. In 1978, in the dawn of the Islamic Revolution, it had 1,450 students from more than fifty countries, in addition to a faculty of 112 teachers from sixteen countries.

History
As a result of the Islamic Revolution (1979), the school would soon meet its fate. In 1980, the last International Baccalaureate (IB) class graduated from Iranzamin, only numbering 24 students. In the 1980–1981 academic year, the new Islamic government of Iran allowed the relationship between Iranzamin and IB to lapse, and transformed Iranzamin into a traditional school for boys which followed a curriculum created by the government.

References

Sources
 

International Baccalaureate schools in Iran
International schools in Tehran
1967 establishments in Iran
Educational institutions established in 1967
1981 disestablishments in Iran
Defunct schools in Iran
Iran–United States relations